Robie Lester (March 23, 1925 – June 14, 2005) was an American actress, singer, voice artist, and author, best known as the voice of "Miss Jessica" in the Rankin/Bass animated special Santa Claus is Comin' to Town, the singing voice of Eva Gabor in Disney's The Aristocats and The Rescuers, and the original "Disneyland Story Reader" for Walt Disney Records read-alongs.

Early life
Lester was born in Megargel, Texas and raised in Northern Ontario, Canada. After a few years in Detroit, she joined the US Army Air Corps before attending UCLA with a major in music. In Hollywood, she worked with Henry Mancini and Herb Alpert, recorded for Liberty, Warner Brothers and A&M, and sang demos for songwriters. At A&M Records Lester recorded one of her most frequently heard, though uncredited, contributions—singing in Spanish behind the narrated portion of the Sandpipers' 1966 hit "Guantanamera".

Career

Work in commercials
Lester was one of the busiest voice-over artists in early 1960s commercials, working in many commercials for Kellogg's breakfast cereal. She was first heard as both of Toucan Sam's infant nephews, with Sam played by Mel Blanc. She also voiced one of the two battling Smackin' Brothers for Sugar Smacks, and sang the commercial's jingle.

Story reader for Disney
In the early 1960s, Disney songwriters Richard and Robert Sherman brought Lester to the attention of Disney's in-house record label. Lester's voice was heard as narrator and singer on dozens of Disney's children's records. One such record was The Story and Song of the Haunted Mansion which also featured the voices of Thurl Ravenscroft and Ron Howard.  Her singing voice was heard on the song "Hippity Hop" from the Disney album Peter Cottontail and Other Funny Bunnies. Beginning in 1965, Lester was the "Disneyland Story Reader" on records where she read the stories, acted out all the parts and reminded children to "turn the page" in their accompanying booklet. Her famous phrase "...when Tinker Bell rings her little bells like this (wind chimes)...turn the page" was heard by countless children of a generation. She also provided the voice of Piglet on some of the early Winnie the Pooh records. In Mouse Tracks: The Story of Walt Disney Records, authors Tim Hollis and Greg Ehrbar state, "It is impossible to calculate how many lives Robie Lester touched by singing, acting, and narrating on more individual Disneyland records than any other performer."

Television and films
One of her most famous roles was as "Miss Jessica", the schoolteacher who becomes Mrs. Kris Kringle (Santa Claus) in the 1970 Rankin/Bass TV special Santa Claus Is Comin' to Town. In the Christmas special, Lester sang a powerful ballad entitled "My World Is Beginning Today" in which her character literally lets her hair down and comes to the aid of her future husband, Kris Kringle.

Robie Lester provided the singing voice for Vera Ralston in Accused of Murder and for Eva Gabor's animated characters in Disney's The Aristocats (Duchess) and The Rescuers (Miss Bianca). Other credits included vocal performances in House of Bamboo and Lisbon (both as Roby Charmandy), The Three Lives of Thomasina, The Famous Adventures of Mr. Magoo, The City That Forgot About Christmas, Devlin, and The Funny Company (as Polly Plum).  She also contributed uncredited vocals to other films and television shows, and had small roles in The Sword of Ali Baba, The Ghost and Mrs. Muir, That Girl, and Night Gallery.

The Disney Storyteller Series album, The Story of the Aristocats, was nominated for a 1971 Grammy Award.

Record producer
In the early 1960s, she formed Mary Music, Funco Publishing, and Golden Key for record production and distribution. She personally produced multiple releases on the Bonanza and Musikon labels.

Later years
Lester spent her final years in Fillmore, California fund raising and crusading for animal rights. She published two novels: The Twenty Dollar Christmas (1996) and Heaven's Gift (1999). She also gratefully discovered a fan base that had grown up with her work. Her last voice performance was in 2002 for the Adventures in Odyssey radio series.

Robie Lester died on June 14, 2005 of cancer at St. Joseph's Hospital in Burbank, California at age 80. She was married to producer Geoff Eccleston, had one daughter Mindy, and three grandchildren.

Her autobiography, Lingerie For Hookers In The Snow: An Audiography Of A Voice Artist, was published in 2006.

Non-Disney discography

Singles
"Give"/"Too Late" (Century 714, 1955) (as Roby Charmandy)
"With You Where You Are"/"Listen To The Wind (My Love)" (Liberty 55033, 1956)
"My Love And I"/"Whispering Guitar" (Liberty 55083, 1957)
"I'm Sorry, I Want A Ferrari" / "It Takes Love To Make A Home" (Mira 112, 1959)
"The Chimney Sweep"/"The Tree And The Sea" (Cascade CA-5901, 1959)
"The Ballad of Cheatin' John"/"The Miracle Of Life" (Lute L-5904, 1960)
"Green Flamingo"/"Another Show Another Town" (Chattahoochee CH-680, 1965)
"One Step Away From Heaven"/"Little Star" (Dot 45-16798, 1965)
"The Party's Over"/"Wait For Him" (Interlude 201, 1966)

Compilation appearances
Terribly Sophisticated Songs: A Collection of Unpopular Songs for Popular People (Warner Brothers Records B1210, 1958) -- "I'm Filled With That Empty Feeling", "Just My Sol"
The Whimsical World of Irving Taylor (Warner Bros. Records WS 1352, 1959) -- "Domestic Wine"
The Charles H. Stern Agency, Inc., Presents the "In" Sound (Private Press, 1967) -- jingle samples
About, Volume 3: Fairy Tales ꞏ Poems ꞏ Songs (Columbia CR 21535, 1968) -- "Sleepy Time", "The Owl and the Pussycat", "Wynken, Blynken and Nod", "Calico Pie"
The Aristocats and Other Cat Songs (Disneyland Records 1333, 1970) -- "Scales And Arpeggios", "She Never Felt Alone", "Siamese Cat Song"
House Of Bamboo Soundtrack (Intrada Records ISC 30, 2006) -- "House of Bamboo", "Be Still, Little Voice"
The Sherman Brothers Songbook (Walt Disney Records 5819506), 2009 -- "She Never Felt Alone"
Cult Hits of the 1960s, Volume 5 (Fervor Records, 2013, Internet release) -- "Ever Blue", "A Life to Live Over" (both previously unreleased)
Bubbling Under: The American Charts 1959-1963 (Fantastic Voyage FVTD212, 2016) -- "The Miracle of Life"
Eden's Island: The Music of an Enchanted Isle (Everland Music EPS 010YG, 2022 reissue) —- “Green Flamingo”

Discography Notes

Citations

References
 "My World Is Beginning Today" audio at Rankin/Bass Site
Robie Lester Obituary
Review of Lingerie For Hookers In The Snow at ClassicImages.com

External links

1925 births
2005 deaths
20th-century American actresses
20th-century American singers
20th-century American women singers
20th-century American novelists
20th-century American women writers
21st-century American biographers
21st-century American women writers
American autobiographers
Actresses from Texas
American voice actresses
Audiobook narrators
Traditional pop music singers
Liberty Records artists
Deaths from cancer in California
UCLA School of the Arts and Architecture alumni
People from Archer County, Texas
People from Fillmore, California
United States Army Air Forces personnel of World War II
Women in the United States Army